Munna is a 2007 Indian Telugu-language action crime film directed by debutant Vamshi Paidipally and produced by Dil Raju. The film stars Prabhas and Ileana D'Cruz in lead roles. Prakash Raj, Kota Srinivasa Rao and Rahul Dev in the supporting roles. The film was postponed several times due to excessive post-production. The film released on 27 April 2007.

Plot
Munna is a college student whose aim is to finish off mafia don Kakha, who keeps the entire city under his grip. An honest politician Srinivasa Rao relentlessly works to expose Kakha but is killed. Meanwhile, Munna's classmate Nidhi falls in love with him. The twist in the tale is that Kakha is none other than Munna's estranged father who tried to sell off his mother and was responsible for the deaths of her and Munna's young sister. Another don in the city named Aatma, who is Kakha's opposition, asks Munna to join him, but he refuses his proposal. The mind game begins. Kakha's second wife, son, and daughter leave him and join Munna. After some incidents including his best friend's death, Munna finds out that Aatma was working for Kakha. The two of them plan on killing Munna in a factory, when all of a sudden, Aatma turns against Kakha and Munna. Kakha kills Aatma for the betrayal. He then commits suicide by shooting himself, having lost everything that he worked for in his life. At the end, Munna succeeds in taking revenge against Kakha.

Cast

 Prabhas as Mahesh alias Munna kumar
 Manoj Nandam as teenage Munna kumar
 Ileana D'Cruz as Nidhi
 Prakash Raj as Kamalakar alias Khakha
 Kota Srinivasa Rao as Minister Srinivasa Rao
 Rahul Dev as Aatma
 Kalyani as Munna's mother
 Sukanya as Kaka's second wife, later Munna's stepmother
 Surya as Dr. Niranjan Chowdary, Nidhi's father
 Sudha as Nidhi's mother
 Tanikella Bharani as Qasim
 Posani Krishna Murali as Kishan
 Brahmaji as Purushottam
 Nalla Venu as Tillu
 Sridhar Rao as Rahul, later Munna kumar's stepbrother
 Venu Madhav as 'Spoon' Mohan
 Chalapathi Rao as Home Minister M. Sudhakar
 Raghu Babu as Satti Pandu
 Sameer Hasan as Police Inspector
 Gundu Sudharshan as Priest
 Uttej as Gun Seller
 Sandra as Nidhi's friend
 Sridhar as Prakash
 Prabhas Sreenu as Sridhar's henchman
 Fish Venkat as Kaka's henchman
 Medha Bahri as Shruti, later Munna's stepsister
 Shriya Saran in an item number in the song "Chammakkuro"

Release
The film released on 27 April 2007.

Critical reception
Idle brain rated 3/5 stated The movie starts off on a dull note and meanders aimlessly till the dark secret is revealed before interval. The flashback episode is unappealing. There are a couple of surprises in the second half. The plus points of the film are Prabhas, stylish taking of the director and lavish budget. On the flip side, screenplay and narration should have been better. There is no holistic perspective in the film. Let us wait and see if Dil Raju's 'Midas Touch' works for this film or not! Fullhyd states Munna is perhaps worth a watch for those seeking a testosterone high. Its fate depends less on its own merit and more on the kind of competing attractions at the box office in future weeks. CineGoer.com rated 2.75/5 stated The movie has a lot of style, but lacks the necessary soul and substance. Swanky visuals, crisp narration, a demigod like hero and two major twists fail to elevate the movie's average viewing status.  Telugu Cinema rates 2.5/5 stated There is not much entertainment in the film. The romance between Prabhas and Illeana was not properly developed. Too much of action is the undoing factor for this film.
No one really said this but still - This has the most cringiest and lamest fight scenes ever, like the scene where he is attacked by goons in a car with guns, is really lame.

Dubbed versions and remakes
The film was dubbed and released in Tamil as Vetri Thirumagan, in Hindi as Bagawat Ek Jung, in Malayalam with the same name and later in Hindustani as Rowdy Munna in 2021.

The film was also remade into Bengali Bangladesh as Amar Challenge starring Shakib Khan and Sahara.

Music
The film had six songs composed by Harris Jayaraj. The Audio was launched on 23 March 2007 in the presence of guests like Krishnam Raju, Allu Arjun, Sukumar and Bhaskar. Bhaskar released the audio cassette and presented the first unit to Sukumar, Allu Arjun presented the first audio CD to Prabhas. Soundtrack version of 'Manasa' featured the vocals of Sadhana Sargam while the film version retained vocals provided by Mahalakshmi Iyer. Harris Jayaraj received a nomination for Filmfare Best Music Director for his work in the film. The song "Baga Baga" is based on Karu Karu Vizhigalal, which itself is based on Westlife’s ‘Hit You With The Real Thing’.

Awards
Sadhana Sargam won the Filmfare Award for Best Female Playback Singer – Telugu for the song "Manasa".
Nandi Award for Best Cinematographer - Ram Prasad

References

External links
 

2007 films
2000s Telugu-language films
2000s masala films
Films directed by Vamsi Paidipally
Films scored by Harris Jayaraj
Telugu films remade in other languages
2007 action drama films
Indian action drama films
2007 directorial debut films
Films directed by Vamshi Paidipally
Sri Venkateswara Creations films